Wayland may refer to:

Computers
 Wayland (display server protocol), a graphical display system for Unix-like computers

Fiction
 Jace Wayland, a character in the Mortal Instruments book series
 Wayland (Star Wars), a planet in the Star Wars fictional universe
 Turk Wayland, in the Rennie Stride mystery series by Patricia Kennealy-Morrison

Music
 Wayland (band), a US rock music band

Mythology and folklore
 Wayland the Smith, figure from northern European folklore

Places

United Kingdom
 HM Prison Wayland, Norfolk
 Wayland, Norfolk
 Wayland Wood, near Watton, Norfolk
 Wayland Rural District, merged into Breckland District, Norfolk, UK
 Wayland's Smithy, a Neolithic site in the UK

United States
 Wayland, Iowa
 Wayland, Kentucky
 Wayland, Massachusetts
 Wayland, Michigan
 Wayland, Missouri
 Wayland, New York
 Wayland (village), New York
 Wayland, Ohio
 Wayland Baptist University (Alaska)
 Wayland Baptist University (Texas)
 Wayland Seminary, the Washington, D.C. school of the National Theological Institute
 Wayland Township, Michigan, which borders the city in Allegan County
 Wayland Township, Chariton County, Missouri

People

Given name
 Wayland Flowers (1939–1988), American puppeteer
 Wayland Young (1923–2009), British writer and SDP and Labour Party politician
 Wayland Becker (1910–1984), American football player
 Wayland Dean (1902–1930), Major League Baseball pitcher
 Wayland Drew (1932–1998), writer born in Oshawa, Ontario
 Wayland Hand (1907–1986), American folklorist
 Wayland Holyfield (born 1942), prominent American songwriter
 Wayland Hoyt (1838–1910), American Baptist minister and author
 Wayland Minot (1889–1957), American football player
 Wayland Maxfield Parrish (1887–?), writer
 Wayland Tunley (1937–2012), British architect

Surname
 Francis Wayland (1796–1865), American Baptist educationist and former president of Brown University
 John Wayland (1849–1890), President of the Chico Board of Trustees, the governing body of Chico, California from 1889 to 1890
 Julius Wayland (1854–1912), US socialist 
 Susan Wayland (born 1980), German fashion model who features in adult photography
 Tom Wayland (born 1974), American voice actor
 April Halprin Wayland (born 1954), American children's and young adult author, poet, and teacher
 Hank Wayland (1906–1983), American swing jazz double-bassist
 Newton Wayland (1940–2013), American orchestral conductor, arranger, composer and keyboardist
 William Wayland (1869–1950), English Conservative Party politician

See also
 Wayland Academy (disambiguation)
 Waylon (disambiguation)
 Wieland (disambiguation)
 Weiland (disambiguation)
 Weyland (disambiguation)
 Wyland (disambiguation)